Melodrama Habibi (Arabic:ميلودراما حبيبي, French: Une chanson dans la tête), the first feature film by Lebanese director Hany Tamba, is a 2008 Lebanese film. The film is set to be released on August 13, 2008 in France and Belgium.

Synopsis
Jamil, a rich business man in Lebanon, decides to bring a once famous French singer, Bruno Caprice, to his wife's birthday (Randa). Bruno, who was known namely for one song "Quand tu t'en vas" in the 70's, accepts the invitation and goes to Beirut. But things get complicated when Randa is kidnapped, and Jamil decides that the show must go on.

Cast and characters
Julia Kassar as Randa Harfouche
Patrick Chesnais as Bruno Caprice
Pierrette Katrib as Nadine
Gabriel Yammine as Cézar
Lara Matar as Reem Harfouche and Randa when she was young
Pierre Chammassian as Jamil Harfouche
Maggie Badawi as Nadine'''s Mother
Majdi Machmouchi as Nadine's Father
Fadi Reaidy as the flight passenger and Madame RoseSilina Choueiry as Roula'' (credited as Selina Choueiry)

See also
After Shave an award-winning short film by Hany Tamba.

References

External links
 
 
 Showtimes in Lebanon on Cineklik

2008 films
2008 comedy-drama films
2000s Arabic-language films
2008 comedy films
2008 drama films
Lebanese comedy-drama films